Mediapart is an independent French investigative online newspaper created in 2008 by Edwy Plenel, former editor-in-chief of Le Monde. Mediapart is published in French, English and Spanish.

Mediapart's income is solely derived from paid subscriptions. It does not carry any advertising and refuses all commercial partnerships. Mediapart's official slogan is « Only our readers can buy us ».

In 2011 Mediapart made a profit for the first time, netting €500,000 from approximately 60,000 subscribers.

Mediapart consists of two main sections: Le Journal, run by professional journalists, and Le Club, a collaborative forum edited by its subscriber community. In 2011, Mediapart launched FrenchLeaks, a whistleblower website inspired by WikiLeaks.

In March 2017, Edwy Plenel said that the online journal had 130,000 paying subscribers.

In March 2021, Mediapart reached more than 220,000 paid subscribers.

According to euro|topics, a news aggregator published by the German federal government agency Bundeszentrale für politische Bildung, Mediapart's political orientation is left wing.

Mediapart was originally a for-profit business. In 2018, the newspaper was converted by shareholders into a non-profit trust in order to fully protect its independence. Le Fond pour une Presse Libre is a non-profit trust created to secure the financial and editorial independence of Mediapart in perpetuity and defend freedom of the press. By design, trust board members don't have any authority over the newsroom.

Landmark investigations 

Mediapart has played a central role in the investigation and revelation of several major French political scandals, including:

The Bettencourt affair in 2010.
The Sarkozy-Gaddafi case in 2012. Mediapart made public two official Libyan documents suggesting the existence of a €50 million transfer from the Libyan regime to Nicolas Sarkozy's successful 2007 campaign for President of France. In June 2021, Mediapart reported that Michèle Marchand, an influential figure in the French celebrity press and proponent of Nicolas Sarkozy, had been taken into custody and interviewed over alleged witness tampering in relation to a witness in the corruption trial against him.
The Cahuzac affair in 2012. Mediapart made public an audio recording from 2000 compromising Jérôme Cahuzac, then France's Minister for the Budget, in a fiscal fraud case.
Former National Front candidate Jean-Claude Veillard's role in the payment of taxes to ISIS middlemen by Lafarge in 2013–2014.
The Benalla Affair. On 31 January 2019, Mediapart released voice recordings attributed to Alexandre Benalla and Vincent Crase which suggested serious offenses committed by the two. On 4 February 2019, the office of Mediapart was subjected to a raid which failed as Mediapart refused it on the ground that the warrant was not authorised by a judge. The raid was in connection with a new investigation concerning a breach of Benalla's and Crase's privacy, prompted by the office of the Prime Minister. Neither of the two have launched action against Mediapart for breach of privacy. Mediapart sees in the raid an attempt by the Government to reveal and intimidate the source of the voice recordings and to stifle journalistic rights to inform the public. Mediapart has never been subject to such a raid before, and received support from other press organisations and the European Federation of Journalists. The incident is reported by the New York Times and the Washington Post.
In July 2019, Mediapart revealed that €63,000 of public money had been spent by François de Rugy on the refurbishment of his official residence (including €19,000 on a dressing room), and published photographs of lobster and champagne dinners allegedly taken between October 2017 and June 2018, implying profligacy at the taxpayers' expense whilst he was President of the National Assembly. On 16 July 2019, Rugy resigned as Ecology Minister.

References

External links
  
 Mediapart English edition
 Mediapart Spanish edition 
 FrenchLeaks 

French-language websites
2008 establishments in France
French news websites
Magazines established in 2008
Magazines published in Paris
French-language magazines
News magazines published in France
Multilingual magazines
Advertising-free websites